The Militsiya of the Kruševo Republic (Macedonian: Милиција на Крушевската Република, Milicija na Krushevskata Republika) was the body responsible for maintaining the order and public security in the Kruševo Republic. It was formed right after the decision of the Interim Government of the Republic of Kruševo on 4 August 1903.

Formation
On 4 August, the day after establishing the Kruševo Republic, the interim government made a decision for establishing a body responsible for maintaining the order and public security which will be led by the mayor of Kruševo, the Bulgarian Hristo Kjurkchiev. After the decision was made, a large number of volunteers gathered in front of the building of the interim government, most of them from the Aromanian neighborhood of Kruševo.

Since they couldn't hire every one of them, they made a compromised decision and suggested the young volunteers to join the 4th Chetnik Detachment under the command of the Bulgarian officer Todor Hristov while the other volunteers formed the city militsiya.

Equipment

Arms

The interim government of the Kruševo Republic in its second decision states that there should be an arsenal with two departments, the first is foundries for casting bullets and the second is a workshop for repair of weapons.

Most of the rifles that were given to the revolutionary committee of Kruševo were handed to the chetas that were stationed around the city. After the city militsiya was established, a rifle shortage appeared which led to a decision that only few of the volunteers will be armed with rifles while the others will be armed with revolvers and sticks. The rifles that some of the volunteers used were Mannlichers.

The ammunition that both the chetas and the city militsiya used were made in the foundries for casting bullets in Kruševo that were established in the houses of Tira Pavlev, Diku Patrikot and Vele Saatchijata by the decision of the interim government. The foundries were supplied by the citizens with lead tin pots from what the bullets were made but before that, people close to the organization were send to the surrounding villages of Kruševo to collect bullets, lead and tin pots. One of them was Donka Budzakovska.

Uniforms

Workshops for moccasins (opintsi), saddlery and sewing were established with the decision of the interim government of the republic. Moccasins and saddlery was made for all of the fighters including rebels from the chetas and volunteers from the city militsiya. Such workshops were established in a few shops and were run by owners of the shops, some of them being Paco Sekulovski, Ivan Pop Dimitrov and Kole Charor.

Sewing workshops were also established to make uniforms for the chetas and the city militsiya, and were under the jurisdiction of Kostu Petrashinku and Kole Lazanov.

Organization

Structure

The volunteers of the militsiya of the Kruševo Republic were stationed in four stations and four substations all in the city. All of them were divided in 18 groups made of eight to ten volunteers led by a chief (Macedonian: Началник, Nachalnik). Some of the chiefs were Gushu Abadzija, Kola Bojadzija, Kole Chkarna, Toma Cholaku, Tega Burek, Kosta Fetadzoka, Gushu Jota, Gagi Kachujan, Lakju Kushora, Vanchu Mocan and Ljasku Prenda, all of the mentioned are Aromanian. All of the chiefs were under the command of the mayor Hristo Kjurkchiev.

Health Treatment

The sixth decision made by the interim government was to establish a hospital. The hospital, as the decision says was established in the exarchist school and was under the jurisdiction of Ilche Stojchev. The hospital was in service of the chetas, city militsiya and the civilians.

See also 
 Ilinden–Preobrazhenie Uprising
 Internal Macedonian Revolutionary Organization

Kruševo Republic
History of Macedonia (region)